Avondale, New Zealand may refer to:

Avondale, Auckland, a suburb of Auckland City
Avondale, Canterbury, a suburb of Christchurch